Iwan Lamby (October 29, 1885 – January 15, 1970) was a Swedish sailor who competed in the 1912 Summer Olympics. He was a crew member of the Swedish boat Erna Signe, which won the silver medal in the 12 metre class.

Iwan's father Boris Roland Lamby, (1856-1893) was (unofficially) one of his mother's, Wilhelmina (Mina) Lamby (1834-1863), 5 children with the Tsar Alexander II of Russia Iwan is buried in a 10 m2 valve at the church of Klara in Stockholm.

References

External links
profile
 https://www.genealogi.net/a-o/namnregister-soh-och-sgt/?gfsohp=Lamby

1885 births
1970 deaths
Swedish male sailors (sport)
Sailors at the 1912 Summer Olympics – 12 Metre
Olympic sailors of Sweden
Olympic silver medalists for Sweden
Olympic medalists in sailing
Medalists at the 1912 Summer Olympics